Pete Levin (born December 20, 1942) is an American jazz keyboardist, composer, and record producer.

Career
Pete Levin grew up in Brookline, Massachusetts. His first instrument as a teenager was the French horn. He studied at Boston University and received a master's degree from Juilliard School in New York City. Levin was introduced to the Hammond organ by a fellow musician in the late 1960s while serving in the army. In the early 1970s he joined the Gil Evans Orchestra as a French horn player. At the time, Levin was experimenting with synthesizers. Evans incorporated Levin's synthesizer sound into the compositions and his role changed to a full-time keyboardist. His fifteen-year association with the Gil Evans Orchestra was followed by an eight-year association with Jimmy Giuffre.

Levin plays piano, Hammond organ, clavinet, and Moog synthesizer. He has produced several albums as a bandleader, including the 2007 Deacon Blues and Jump! in 2010. In 2014 he released a collaborative album with his brother, bassist Tony Levin, titled Levin Brothers. The album is a tribute to  Oscar Pettiford and Julius Watkins.

Levin has performed for film and television scores including Missing in Action, Lean on Me, Silver Bullet, Red Scorpion, The Color of Money, Maniac, Spin City, America's Most Wanted and Star Trek. He has composed orchestral scores of his own for Zelimo and The Dybbuk. He was awarded the Army Commendation Medal for writing the official military band arrangement of the U.S. Infantry song.

He has worked with Carla Bley, Brubeck Brothers, Hiram Bullock, Jimmy Cobb, Billy Cobham, Willie Colón, Kal David, Miles Davis, Rachelle Farrell, Bryan Ferry, Gregory Hines, The Thad Jones/Mel Lewis Orchestra, Annie Lennox, Chuck Mangione, Charles Mingus, Gerry Mulligan, Jaco Pastorius, Genya Ravan, Robbie Robertson, Salt-n-Pepa, David Sanborn, John Scofield, Wayne Shorter, Paul Simon, Lew Soloff, John Tropea, Joe Louis Walker, Vanessa Williams, and Lenny White.

Regarding his creative work, Levin stated that "All my arranging and orchestrating work is grounded in what I experience in live performance...My best and most creative ideas come from playing live."

Discography

As leader
 The New Age of Christmas (Atlantic, 1989) with Danny Gottlieb
 Masters in This Hall (Gramavision, 1990) with Danny Gottlieb
 Party in the Basement (Gramavision, 1990)
 A Solitary Man (Gramavision, 1991)
 Music for the Dybbuk (Peter Levin Music, 1974/1996)
 Harmony (Alternate Mode, 1998)
 Crystals (Alternate Mode, 2000)
 Meditations (Alternate Mode, 2001) with Ali Ryerson
 Zelimo (PLM, 2001)
 Rhythm of the Spirit (Alternate Mode, 2002)
 Deacon Blues (Motéma, 2007)
 Certified Organic (PLM, 2008)
 Live in Foggia: Pete Levin Trio (PLM, 2009)
 Jump! (Independent, 2010)
 IridiumLive 008: 4-18-2012 (E1/Iridium Live, 2013)
 Levin Brothers (Lazy Bones, 2014) with Tony Levin
 Möbius (IYOUWE, 2017)

As sideman
With Marc Black
 Pictures of the Highway (Suma, 2010) 
 Live at the Bearsville Theater (Independent, 2015)
 Sing for the Silenced (Independent, 2015)

With Jay Chattaway
 Maniac (Southeast, 1980)
 Invasion USA (Varese Saraband, 1985)
 Maniac Cop (Varese Saraband, 1988) 
 Red Scorpion (Varese Saraband, 1989)
 Maniac Cop 2 (Independent, 2014)

With John Clark
 I Will (Postcards, 1997)
 The Odd Couple Quintet (Composers Concordance, 2015)

With Bill Comeau
 Some Beautiful Day (Avant Garde, 1972)
 Grizzly Bear Hunt (Poison Ring, 1973)

With Gil Evans
 Blues in Orbit (Enja, 1971)
 Svengali (Atlantic, 1973)
 Live at Montreux (Phillips, 1974) 
 The Gil Evans Orchestra Plays the Music of Jimi Hendrix (RCA, 1974)
 There Comes a Time (RCA, 1975)
 The Tokyo Concert (West Wind, 1976)
 Live in Barcelona (Atlantic, 1976)
 Priestess (Antilles, 1977)
 Parabola (Horo, 1979)
 Gil Evans Live at the Royal Festival Hall London 1978 (RCA, 1979)
 Live at the Public Theater (New York 1980) (Trio, 1981)
 Lunar Eclipse (New Tone, 1981)
 Live at Sweet Basil (Gramavision, 1984 [1986])
 Live at Sweet Basil Vol. 2 (Gramavision, 1984 [1987])
 Bud and Bird (Electric Bird/King, 1986 [1987])
 Farewell (Evidence, 1986 [1992])
 The Honey Man (New Tone, 1986) 
 Live at Umbria Jazz (Umbria Jazz, 2000)

With Rachelle Ferrell
 First Instrument (Blue Note, 1990) 
 Somethin' Else (Independent, 1997)

With Jimmy Giuffre
 Dragonfly (Soul Note, 1983)
 Quasar (Soul Note, 1985)
 Liquid Dancers (Soul Note, 1991)

With Richie Hart
 Blues in the Alley (Zoho, 2003) 
 Greasy Street (Zoho, 2005)

With Tony Levin
 Waters of Eden (Narada, 2000)
 Resonator (Narada, 2006)

With Amy Rogell
 Come to the Playground (2000) 
 Miles of Smiles (2007)

With Raphael Rudd
 Joyfest (1993) 
 The Awakening Chronicles (Wedge Music, 1996)

With John Scofield
 Electric Outlet (Gramavision, 1984) 
 Slow Sco (Gramavision, 1990)

With Lew Soloff
 Hanalei Bay (King, 1983)
 My Romance (King, 1988)
 Little Wing (Sweet Basil, 1991)

With Michael Veitch
 Heartlander (2006) 
 Painted Heart (2007)
 The Veitch Boys (2015)

With Lou Volpe
 Can You Hear That (Cap, 2003) 
 Undercovers (Jazz Guitar, 2006)

With Lenny White
 Present Tense (Hip Bop, 1994) 
 Renderers of Spirit (Hip Bop Essence, 1997)
 Edge (Hip Bop, 1998)

With others
 Singalong Junk (Mercury, 1972), Gap Mangione
 Rejuvenation (Columbia, 1975), Don Elliott
 A Piece of the Apple (Arista, 1976), New York Mary
 Heart to Heart (Warner, 1978), David Sanborn
 Live at 55 Grand (1982), Jaco Pastorius
 So Nobody Else Can Hear (Contempo Vibrato, 1983), Jimmy Cobb
 Archipeligo (Sum, 1984), Barb Truex
 Manhattan Blue (King, 1986), Shunzo Ohno
 I'm a Survivor (Mercury, 1987), Zuice
 Robbie Robertson (Geffen, 1987), Robbie Robertson
 In Touch (Novus, 1988), Amina Claudine Myers
 On the Rise (GRP, 1989), Deborah Henson-Conant
 Dade ... In the Shade (Wavetone, 1990), Mark Egan
 Naked to the World (Atlantic, 1991), Nicki Richards
 In Flight (1993), Pieces of a Dream
 Body and Soul (Atlantic, 1993), Regina Carter
 BIII: Hard Rock Jazz (JVC, 1996), Toshihiko Kankawa
 Uptown Saturday Night (Arista, 1997) Camp Lo
 Smooth Romance (jazm, 1998), Janet Marlowe
 Top of the Food Chain (Sweetthing, 1998), Ellie Sarty
 La La Means Love (Motown, 1999), La La
 Second Nature (Blue Forest, 2000), Brubeck Brothers
 The Last Romantic (Narada, 2001), Artie Traum
 Duke, Billy & Tadd (Independent, 2004), Peter Welker
 Days of Horses (Independent, 2004), Aztec Two Step
 The O'Franken Factor Factor (Artemis, 2004), Al Franken
 GOP Party Monsters (Para, 2004), Wayne Lammers
 I Walk the Road Again (Roaring Stream, 2005), Happy Traum
 Myth Songs (Mythsongs, 2005), Nick Humez
 Foreign Funk (Markei, 2007), Keith Marks
 Shining Hour (Independent, 2007), Jeff Oster
 Kingsway (Independent, 2008), Roman Klun
 Flowers to Strangers (2008), Lee Marvin
 Little Girl Dreams (2008), Athena Reich
 After the War (Independent, 2008), Rod MacDonald
 Wit of the Staircase (Vermicious Knid, 2009), Andy Rothstein
 Outside Looking In (Independent, 2009), Charles Lyonhart
 Kaleidoscope (Guavajamm, 2010), Lynette Washington
 And Here's to You (Macdee, 2010), Betty MacDonald and Joe Beck
 Fortune Cookie Philosophy (Independent, 2010), Erin Hobson
 Lost in Space (Independent, 2011), GI Blythe
 Con Brio! (Independent, 2011), Ali Ryerson
 Lovers After All (Independent, 2011), Deborah Winters
 Introducing Letizia Gambi (Jando Music, 2011), Letizia Gambi
 Cheesecake Girl (Independent, 2012), Genya Ravan
 Wild Animals (2014), Robert Capowsky
 Leila Gobi (Clermont Music, 2014), Leila Gobi
 Baudi (Clermont Music, 2015), Mamadou Kelly
 Djamila (Clermont Music, 2015), Mamadou Kelly
 Barcelona Notebook (Independent, 2015), Vincent Pasternak
 Sonar (Independent, 2015), Nick Holmes
 Uprising (Independent, 2016), Joan Henry
 Big City Blues (Independent, 2016), Ling Zhang
 Waxwing (Independent, 2016), Chrissy Gardner
 Blue Monday (Independent, 2016), Letizia Gambi
 All Kinds of Beki (Random Chance, 2016), Beki Brindle
 Find My Way (Independent, 2016), Hillary Chase
 Good Old Songs (2017), Rene Bailey 
 Cool Night (Pierdon, 2017), Kathy Ingraham
 Flaming June (Independent, 2017), Kurt Henry

References

External links
 
 "Music with the Levin Brothers – Interview", WAMC Northeast Public Radio. Archived
 "The Art of Music Tech with Pete Levin - Video Interview", filmed and edited by 23db Productions. August 20, 2016.
 Micallef, Ken. “Levin Brothers Express Love for ‘Cool’ School.” Downbeat. February, 2015. PDF Archived
 Rowe, Monk. "Pete Levin :: Jazz Archive Interviews." Transcript of video interview. Hamilton Archive and Fillius Jazz Archive, 2001.
 Burdick, John. "Band of Brothers." Almanac Weekly, 2017. Archived.
 Manfredi, Mariano and Guazzelli, Andres. "Brothers should Stick together." Enterarte, March 2017. 
 Rubin, Jason. "Concert Preview: Local Boys Make Cool Jazz — The Levin Brothers Reunite." The Arts Fuse, 2017.
 Thompson, Scott. 
 Desouteiro, Arnaldo. 
 Zee, Roger. 
 
 
  Recorded at Avatar Studios (Power Station), New York, NY. Video capture by JM Zervoulei JMZ Productions.
  Interviewed by Markus Reuter.

American jazz keyboardists
American jazz horn players
Jazz fusion musicians
American jazz composers
American male jazz composers
Musicians from New York (state)
Musicians from Boston
Boston University alumni
Juilliard School alumni
Living people
1942 births
Jazz musicians from Massachusetts
20th-century American keyboardists
Motéma Music artists
20th-century American male musicians